Aeschrion may refer to a number of different people in Classical history:

Aeschrion of Syracuse, assisted Verres in robbing the Syracusans
Aeschrion of Samos, iambic poet
Aeschrion of Mytilene, epic poet, possibly identical with Aeschrion of Samos
Aeschrion of Pergamon, 2nd century physician